Saetheria is a genus of European non-biting midges in the subfamily Chironominae of the bloodworm family Chironomidae.

Species
S. hirta Sæther, 1983
S. reissi Jackson, 1977
S. tylus (Townes, 1945)

References

Chironomidae
Diptera of Europe